Continental climates often have a significant annual variation in temperature (warm summers and cold winters). They tend to occur in the middle latitudes (40 to 55 north), within large landmasses where prevailing winds blow overland bringing some precipitation, and temperatures are not moderated by oceans. Continental climates occur mostly in the Northern Hemisphere due to the large landmasses found there. Most of northern and northeastern China, eastern and southeastern Europe, Western and north western Iran, central and southeastern Canada, and the central and northeastern United States have this type of climate. Continentality is a measure of the degree to which a region experiences this type of climate.

In continental climates, precipitation tends to be moderate in amount, concentrated mostly in the warmer months. Only a few areas—in the mountains of the Pacific Northwest of North America and in Iran, northern Iraq, adjacent Turkey, Afghanistan, Pakistan, and Central Asia—show a winter maximum in precipitation. A portion of the annual precipitation falls as snowfall, and snow often remains on the ground for more than a month. Summers in continental climates can feature thunderstorms and frequent hot temperatures; however, summer weather is somewhat more stable than winter weather. In the Köppen climate classification system, continental climates are identified by their first letter, a capital D.

Seasons
For example, spring may arrive as soon as March in the southern parts of this zone or as late as May in the north. Summers are warm or hot while winters are below freezing and sustain frost.

Köppen climate classification
Most such areas have Köppen climate classifications of Dfa, with hot summers (mean temperature above 22 °C/71.6 °F), or Dfb, with warm summers (mean temperature below 22 °C/71.6 °F). Dry-summer continental climates (Dsa and Dsb) exist in high altitude areas near Mediterranean climates (Csa/Csb). Dry-winter continental climates (Dwa and Dwb) exist in high altitude areas near humid subtropical climates (Cwa) or subtropical highland climates (Cwb). Subarctic climates (Dfc, Dwc, Dsc, Dfd, Dwd, and Dsd), with very cold and long winters but with at least one month above , are also continental climates.

In some cases, the semi-arid climate classification of BSk and the arid climate of BWk can also be considered to be continental as long as it has cold winters, though it isn't by the Köppen classification. The definition of this climate regarding temperature is as follows: the mean temperature of the coldest month must be below -3 C (26.6 F) and there must be at least four months whose mean temperatures are at or above .

Climatology
Continental climates exist where cold air masses infiltrate during the winter from shorter days and warm air masses form in summer under conditions of high sun and longer days. Places with continental climates are as a rule are either far from any moderating effect of oceans or are so situated that prevailing winds tend to head offshore. Such regions get quite warm in the summer, achieving temperatures characteristic of tropical climates but are colder than any other climates of similar latitude in the winter.

Neighboring climates
In the Köppen climate system, these climates grade off toward temperate climates equator-ward where winters are less severe and semi-arid climates or arid climates where precipitation becomes inadequate for tall-grass prairies and shrublands. In Europe these climates may grade off into oceanic climates (Cfb) or subpolar oceanic climates (Cfc) in which the influence of cool oceanic air masses is more marked toward the west. In eastern Asia and the eastern and central United States these climates grade off toward humid subtropical climates (Cfa/Cwa) or subtropical highland climates (Cwb) to the south.

List of locations with a continental climate
The climate is continental if the 0°C coldest-month isotherm is used, but it is temperate if the -3°C isotherm is used.

Eurasia

Asia

Armenia: Yerevan
Azerbaijan: Qabala
China: Beijing, Changchun, Dalian, Harbin, Jinan (bordering Cwa), Lhasa (bordering BSk/Cwb), Qingdao (bordering Cwa), Shenyang, Shigatse, Ulanhot, Ürümqi (bordering BSk)
Georgia: Akhaltsikhe
Iran: Ardabil (bordering BSk), Hamadan (Dsa bordering BSk), Tabriz (Dsa bordering BSk), Urmia (bordering BSk)
Japan: Aomori, Asahikawa, Hakodate, Kushiro, Nagano, Nichinan (bordering Cfa), Sapporo
Kazakhstan: Almaty, Astana, Shymkent (Dsa)
Kyrgyzstan: Bishkek (Dsa)
Mongolia: Baruunturuun (bordering Dwc) 
North Korea: Haeju, Pyongyang
Russia: Barnaul, Irkutsk, Khabarovsk, Kurilsk (bordering Dfc), Novosibirsk, Omsk, Tomsk, Vladivostok, Yekaterinburg, Yuzhno-Sakhalinsk
South Korea: Chuncheon, Daejeon, Incheon, Seoul
South Ossetia: Tskhinvali (disputed with Georgia)
Turkey: Ardahan, Erzurum, Hakkâri (Dsa), Muş (Dsa)

Europe

Austria: Innsbruck, Klagenfurt, Salzburg
Belarus: Brest, Gomel, Minsk, Pinsk
Bosnia and Herzegovina: Goražde, Istočno Sarajevo, Livno
Bulgaria: Pazardzhik (bordering Cfa), Pernik, Pleven, Sofia (bordering Cfb), Veliko Tarnovo
Croatia: Gospić
Czech Republic: Brno, Ostrava, Plzeň
Estonia: Hiiumaa, Pärnu, Saaremaa, Tallinn
Finland: Åland, Helsinki, Kouvola, Lappeenranta, Pori, Turku
France: Chamonix
Germany: Augsburg (bordering Cfb), Erfurt, Kempten, Magdeburg (bordering Cfb), Potsdam (bordering Cfb), Wittenberg 
Greece: Aetomilitsa, Kato Vermio, Samarina
Hungary: Debrecen, Győr (bordering Cfb), Kecskemét (bordering Cfb), Miskolc, Pécs, Szeged, Szombathely
Italy: Cortina d'Ampezzo
Kosovo: Pristina (disputed with Serbia)
Latvia: Liepāja, Riga
Liechtenstein: Schaan (bordering Cfb)
Lithuania: Kaunas, Klaipėda, Vilnius
Moldova: Bălți, Chișinău, Comrat
Montenegro: Žabljak (bordering Dfc)
Norway: Bodø (bordering Dfc), Drammen, Hamar, Lillehammer (bordering Dfc), Oslo, Steinkjer, Trondheim
Poland: Białystok, Gdańsk, Katowice, Kraków, Łódź, Lublin, Poznań (bordering Cfb), Warsaw 
Romania: Bucharest, Cluj-Napoca, Iași, Ploiești, Sibiu, Timișoara
Russia: Chelyabinsk, Grozny, Kaliningrad, Kazan, Moscow, Nalchik, Nizhny Novgorod, Perm, Rostov-on-Don, Saint Petersburg, Samara, Smolensk, Ufa, Vladikavkaz, Voronezh
Serbia: Nova Varoš, Subotica
Slovakia: Bratislava (bordering Cfb), Košice, Prešov
Slovenia: Murska Sobota
Sweden: Halmstad (bordering Cfb), Norrköping, Stockholm, Sundsvall, Uppsala, Visby (bordering Cfb)
Switzerland: Gstaad, La Brévine (bordering Dfc), Poschiavo
Transnistria: Tiraspol (disputed with Moldova)
Ukraine: Dnipro, Donetsk (disputed with Russia), Kharkiv, Kherson, Kryvyi Rih, Kyiv, Lviv, Odesa (bordering BSk/Cfa), Uzhhorod

North America

Canada
 
Calgary (higher areas are Dfc)
Charlottetown
Edmonton
Fredericton
Goose Bay, NL (bordering Dfc)
Halifax
Hamilton, ON
Kelowna, BC
Moncton
Montreal
Moose Factory
Ottawa
Penticton, BC (bordering BSk)
Prince George, BC
Quebec City
Regina (bordering BSk)
Sable Island (bordering Cfb)
St. John's, NL
Saskatoon (bordering BSk)
Sudbury
Toronto
Windsor
Winnipeg
Yarmouth, NS

United States
Albany
Allentown, PA
Billings, MT (bordering BSk)
Boone, NC (bordering Cfb)
Boston
Bridgeport, CT (bordering Cfa)
Buffalo
Burlington, VT
Cape Cod (bordering Cfb)
Cheyenne, WY (bordering BSk)
Chicago
Cincinnati (downtown is Cfa)
Cleveland
Columbus, OH
Des Moines
Detroit
Fairbanks (bordering Dfc)
Fargo, ND
Flagstaff, AZ (bordering BSk)
Grand Rapids, MI 
Hartford
Idaho Falls (bordering BSk)
Indianapolis
Juneau (bordering Dfc)
Kansas City
Kodiak, AK
Lancaster, PA (bordering Cfa)
Loveland, CO (bordering BSk)
Mammoth Lakes, CA (Dsb)
Manchester, NH
Milwaukee
Minneapolis
Omaha
Pittsburgh
Portland, ME
Providence, RI
Rochester
Salt Lake City (Dsa bordering Csa)
Scranton, PA
Sioux Falls, SD
Spokane, WA (Dsa)
Taos, NM (bordering BSk)
Wheeling, WV
Winchester, VA (bordering Cfa)

Saint Pierre and Miquelon
 Bordering Dfc

Oceania

Australia

Dinner Plain, Victoria
Kiandra, New South Wales (bordering Cfb)

See also
 Hemiboreal climate
 Humid continental climate
 Microthermal climate
 Subarctic climate

References

External links

Climate of Europe
Köppen climate types